The 2013 Porsche Carrera Cup Great Britain was a multi-event, one make motor racing championship held across England and Scotland. The championship featured a mix of professional motor racing teams and privately funded drivers, competing in Porsche 911 GT3 cars that conform to the technical regulations for the championship. It is a multi class championship, with drivers grouped based on their ability and experience into three classes: Professional, Professional-Amateur 1 (Pro-Am 1) and Professional-Amateur 2 (Pro-Am 2). It forms part of the extensive program of support categories built up around the BTCC centrepiece.

This season was the eleventh Porsche Carrera Cup Great Britain. The season commenced on 31 March at Brands Hatch – on the circuit's Indy configuration – and concluded on 13 October at the same venue, utilising the Grand Prix circuit, after twenty races held at ten meetings, all in support of the 2013 British Touring Car Championship.

Entry list

Race calendar and results
On 29 August 2012, the British Touring Car Championship announced the race calendar for the 2013 season, for all of the series competing on the TOCA package.

Championship standings

References

Porsche Carrera Cup
Porsche Carrera Cup Great Britain seasons